The cobbler wobbegong, Sutorectus tentaculatus, is a carpet shark in the family Orectolobidae, the only member of the genus Sutorectus.  It is found in the subtropical eastern Indian Ocean around Western Australia between latitudes 26° S and 35° S. It is frequently found in rocky and coral reef areas.  Cobbler wobbegongs reach a length of 92 cm. It has unbranched dermal lobes on the head, rows of warty tubercles along the back and black spots on the body and fins.

Its reproduction is ovoviviparous.

See also

 List of sharks

References

External links
 
 

cobbler wobbegong
Ovoviviparous fish
Marine fish of Southern Australia
cobbler wobbegong
cobbler wobbegong